Buda is the western part of Budapest, Hungary.

In Ruthenia or Kyivan Rus, "buda" was a populated place of craftsmen who were practicing in production of potash, charcoal, tar

Buda or BUDA may also refer to:

Places

Australia
 Buda Castlemaine, an historic house in Castlemaine, Victoria

Belgium
 Buda (Kortrijk), an historic neighbourhood and island in the city of Kortrijk, Flanders

Moldova
 Buda, Călăraşi, a commune in Călăraşi district

Poland
 Buda, Masovian Voivodeship

Romania
 Buda, Buzău, a commune in Buzău County
 Buda, a village in Berzunți Commune, Bacău County
 Buda, a village in Blăgeşti Commune, Bacău County
 Buda, a village in Răchitoasa Commune, Bacău County
 Buda, a village in Coșula Commune, Botoşani County
 Buda, a village in Brăeşti Commune, Iaşi County
 Buda, a village in Lespezi Commune, Iaşi County
 Buda, a village in Cornetu Commune, Ilfov County
 Buda, a village in Ariceștii Rahtivani Commune, Prahova County
 Buda, a village in Râfov Commune, Prahova County
 Buda, a village in Râşca Commune, Suceava County
 Buda, a village in Zvoriștea Commune, Suceava County
 Buda, a village in Alexandru Vlahuţă Commune, Vaslui County
 Buda, a village in Bogdăneşti Commune, Vaslui County
 Buda, a village in Oșești Commune, Vaslui County
 Buda, a village administered by Ocnele Mari town, Vâlcea County
 Buda, a village in Corbița Commune, Vrancea County
 Buda Crăciuneşti, a village in Cislău Commune, Buzău County
 Buda (Argeș), a tributary of the Argeș River in Argeș County
 Buda, a tributary of the Șoimeni River in Cluj County
 Buda, a tributary of the Cernu River in Bacău County

Ukraine
Buda, a village in Mahala Hromada, Chernivtsi Oblast
Buda, a village in Chornobyl Raion which was taken out of registry after the Chernobyl disaster
Buda, a village of Tarashcha Hromada, Kyiv Oblast
Buda, a village of Ivano-Frankove Hromada near Lviv
 Buda, a river, a tributary of Khorol

United States
 Buda, Illinois, a village
 Buda, Nebraska, an unincorporated community
 Buda, Texas, a city

Other
 Buda, the Hungarian name of the Hunnic ruler Bleda
 Mario Buda (1883–1963), Italian anarchist, Galleanist, and likely assailant of the 1920 Wall Street bombing
 Boston Ultimate Disc Alliance, a nonprofit group that organizes Ultimate leagues
 Buda (folk religion) or Bouda, the Ethiopian name for a werehyena
 Buda Engine Co., a U.S. engine manufacturer.
 Bukidnon–Davao Road, also known as BuDa Road, a highway in the Philippines
 "BUDA" folder ("Binding Unit Data Array" or "Binding Unit Data Area"), used as BD-J (Blu-ray Java) local data storage in Blu-ray players, especially BD-LIVE content. The folder usually appears on USB storage devices after connecting to a network-enabled Blu-Ray Disc player.

See also 
 Buda River (disambiguation)
 Buddha (disambiguation)
 Bodø, a municipality in Norway with a similar pronunciation.
 Budeni (disambiguation)
 Budești (disambiguation)

Family names:
 Budeanu — search for "Budeanu"
 Budescu — search for "Budescu"